The idea of founding a theory of painting after the model of music theory was suggested by Goethe in 1807 and gained much regard among the avant-garde artists of the 1920s, the Weimar culture period, like Paul Klee.

From Goethe to Klee
Goethe famously said in 1807 that painting "lacks any established, accepted theory as exists in music". Kandinsky in 1911 reprised Goethe, agreeing that painting needed a solid foundational theory, and such theory should be patterned after the model of music theory, and adding that there is a deep relationship between all the arts, not only between music and painting.

The comparison of painting with music gained much regard among the avant-garde artists of the 1920s, the Weimar culture period, like Paul Klee.

Structural semantic rhetoric
The Belgian semioticians known under the name Groupe µ, developed a method of painting research called structural semantic rhetoric; the aim of this method is to determine the stylistic and aesthetic features of any painting by means of the rhetorical operations of addition, omission, permutation and transposition.

See also
 Aesthetics of music
 Philosophy of music
 Synesthesia in art 
 Visual semiotics

Notes

References
Kandinsky [1911] Concerning the Spiritual in Art, chapter The language of form and colour pp. 27–45

Painting